Trond Skramstad (born 6 December 1960) is a Norwegian decathlete. He represented Kongsberg IF. Skramstad became Norwegian decathlon champion in 1983, 1985 and 1986.

His personal best in decathlon is 8097 points, achieved in June 1984 in Emmitsburg at Mount St. Mary's University . This was the Norwegian record until August 1999, when Benjamin Jensen improved it to 8160 points.

Achievements

References

External links

1960 births
Living people
Norwegian decathletes
Athletes (track and field) at the 1984 Summer Olympics
Olympic athletes of Norway
Kongsberg IF